Silence... Can You Hear It? is a 2021 Indian Hindi-language thriller film written and directed by Aban Bharucha Deohans.  The film produced by Zee Studios, stars Manoj Bajpayee, Prachi Desai and Arjun Mathur. The story of the film revolves around the mysterious disappearance of a woman. It was digitally released on ZEE5 on 26 March 2021. The film marks Desai's comeback after 4 years.

Plot 
A team of special cops are investigating the mysterious murder of a high profile victim, who is the daughter of a retired justice. The team is led by ACP Avinash Verma who now works in narcotics division but has been brought on with a special team of serious crime officers to solve this case. The Superior Officers don't favour Avinash Verma but the retired justice Choudhary requests them to hire him for the case as he wants the case to be solved quickly and raptly. Pooja Choudhary, the daughter of Justice Choudhary was found on a tourist site on a hill top by four college students. There was a big wound on her head. The forensic department had found some bits of copper on the wound. This indicates that whatever equipment was used for killing her was a copper one. Also as there were no indications of sexual harassment, justifies that it was not  rape case. If it was not a rape case then it means that due to some personal reason the killer had killed Pooja and that the killer is just around them. There were no blood scattered from Pooja's head on the surrounding spot she was found in which indicates that she was killed in a different place and her body was dumped in the spot she was found in.  Pooja last visited her best friend, Kavita's house in the hope to meet her and show something. But due to an exhibition in Pune, Kavita had gone to Pune and Pooja had spent the night in Kavita's house as it was very late. Kavita's husband Ravi is an MLA. He and Dadu the servant were there and they provided her a room.

ACP Verma and his team begin solving the murder mystery and they have a target to close the case and identify the killer in a week. ACP Verma begins investigation by questioning Pooja's family members and then MLA Ravi Khanna and his helper Dadu. After series of investigation and intriguing encounters ACP Verma solves the case and the plot is revealed. Pooja and Rishabh have an affair, which Rishab's fiancée Kia discovers. Enraged she visits Pooja after learning she's at Kavita Khanna's place and demands that Pooja leave Rishabh alone, as he's her fiancé but Pooja asks her to speak to Rishabh and not her. This angers Kia and she hits her hard on the head and not knowing what just happened she flees the spot. Kia is finally arrested and Rishab and MLA Ravi Khanna are also arrested for tampering with the evidence.

Cast 

Manoj Bajpayee as ACP Avinash Verma IPS
Prachi Desai as Inspector Sanjana Bhatia
Arjun Mathur as MLA Ravi Khanna
Barkha Singh as Pooja Choudhary
Hitha Chandrashekhar as Kavita Khanna
Sahil Vaid as Inspector Amit Chauhan 
Ujjawal Gauraha as Saneshwar urf Sunny 
Shishir Sharma as Justice Chaudhary, Pooja's father
Denzil Smith as Commissioner Sanjay Sharma IPS
Vaquar Shaikh as Inspector Raj Gupta 
Sohaila Kapoor as Mrs. Chaudhary, Pooja's mother
Amit Thakkar as Rishabh
Bhushan Shimpi as Javed
Garima Yagnik as Kia

Release 
Initially the digital release date was on 5 March 2021 on ZEE5 platform. Later, it was released on 26 March 2021.

Reception
The movie generally received positive to mixed reaction, with particular praise to Bajpayee's and other cast's performance.

Joginder Tuteja of Rediff Movies wrote "Silence... Can You Hear It is definitely a recommended watch" giving the movie 3.5 stars. Shubhra Gupta of Indian Express "Manoj Bajpayee is the star of this entertaining murder mystery" While giving the film Two stars.
One of the critics who didn't like the movie, Gurnaaz Kaur of The Tribune wrote "The movie Silence…can you hear it? is a screaming bore!".

References

External links 

 
 Silence… Can You Hear It? on ZEE5

2021 films
ZEE5 original films
Indian mystery drama films
2021 direct-to-video films
2021 thriller films